Rafael Leme Amorim (born 30 July 1987) is a Brazilian professional football player who plays as a centre-back.

Career
Born in São Paulo, Amorim is arrived in Portugal in 2009, joining the reserve side of 
C.S. Marítimo, then competing in the third tier.

Two seasons later, he went on loan to Desportivo de Aves and made his professional debut at 2 October 2011, in a home win against Arouca. eventually becoming an undisputed starter, when he signed as permanent player for the Aves-side.

On 17 January 2014, Amorim moved to Paços de Ferreira, becoming a constant challenger for the starting line-up, but suffering an injury plagued season in 2014-15. On 3 June 2015, he moved to Qatar, joining Mesaimeer. However, just six-months later, he returned to Portugal to play for Belenenses. After another six-months, he traded clubs again and signed with Tondela.

References

External links

1987 births
Living people
Footballers from São Paulo
Brazilian footballers
Association football defenders
C.S. Marítimo players
C.D. Aves players
F.C. Paços de Ferreira players
C.F. Os Belenenses players
C.D. Tondela players
Mesaimeer SC players
C.D. Cova da Piedade players
P.O. Xylotymbou players
Primeira Liga players
Liga Portugal 2 players
Cypriot Second Division players
Brazilian expatriate footballers
Expatriate footballers in Portugal
Expatriate footballers in Qatar
Expatriate footballers in Cyprus
Brazilian expatriate sportspeople in Portugal